Currently, Turkey has no operating commercial nuclear reactors. However, four VVER-1200 reactors at the Akkuyu Nuclear Power Plant, are currently under construction and expected to come online in 2023. The nuclear power debate has a long history, with the 2018 construction start in Mersin Province being the sixth major attempt to build a nuclear power plant since 1960. Nuclear power has been criticised as very expensive to taxpayers.

Plans for Sinop Nuclear Power Plant and another at İğneada have stalled. The country is considering buying small modular reactors.

History

Early years 
Turkey's nuclear activities started soon after the first International Conference on the Peaceful Uses of Atomic Energy, held in Geneva in September 1955. In 1961, a 1 MW test reactor at Çekmece Nuclear Research and Training Center was commissioned for educational and research purposes. As stated by the World Nuclear Association, the first endeavour was a feasibility report in 1970 involving a 300 MWe facility. Then in 1973, the electricity authority agreed to construct a demonstration plant of 80 MWe. In 1976, Akkuyu, a site 45 kilometers west of the southern city Silifke, was chosen as the nuclear power plant site. The Prime Ministry Atomic Energy Authority issued a license for this place. An effort to develop multiple plants failed in 1980 due to a failure of ensuring financial guarantees by the government, that viewed coal plants in Turkey as more favorable. Turkey suspended work on nuclear plants due to the Chernobyl disaster that occurred in the Soviet Union in 1986. In 1988, the TEK Nuclear Power Plants Department was closed.

In 1993, a nuclear plant was included in the country's investment scheme. However, the revised bidding requirements were not issued until 1996. Bids were issued by Atomic Energy of Canada Limited, the Westinghouse Electric Company-Mitsubishi Heavy Industries consortium and the Framatome-Siemens consortium for a 2000 MWe plant at Akkuyu. The final bid deadline was in 1997, but the government postponed its several times, until the preparations were scrapped due to financial difficulties.

2000s 
In May 2004, the Minister of Energy and Natural Resources Hilmi Güler said "We will meet with the countries that produce these plants soon" and brought the issue of nuclear power plant back to the agenda. In his statement, Güler stated that the technical investigations on nuclear power plants are continuing and that negotiations will be held soon. Güler announced that the construction of the first power plant will begin in 2007. In 2006, the northern Turkish city of Sinop, located near the Black Sea, was designated to host a commercial nuclear power plant. According to World Nuclear Association, the Sinop site has the advantage of cooling the water temperature approximately 5 degree Celsius lower than those at Akkuyu, helping each thermal reactor to achieve approximately 1 percent greater power output. A 100 MWe demonstration plant was to be installed there. Subsequently, 5000 MWe of additional plants were to come into operation from 2012 onwards. For construction and service, a form of public-private partnership (PPP) has been anticipated. The government said it aimed to have a total of 4500 MWe of energy running from three nuclear power stations by the end of 2015. Talks were happening with AECL over two 750 MWe CANDU reactors. The pressurized water reactor was also favoured by the government. The first reactors, totalling some 5000 MWe, were to be installed at Akkuyu, as the location already was approved. At the same time, the licensing for Sinop was still progressing.

A new legislation on the construction and maintenance of nuclear power plants was enacted by the Turkish Parliament in 2007. The bill called for the establishment of requirements for the design and operation of the plants by the Turkish Atomic Energy Authority (TAEK). It enables the government to grant purchase guarantees to firms for the total energy produced in nuclear power plants. Waste control and decommissioning were also covered by the bill. Turkey started to be subjected to the Paris Convention on Third Party Liability in the Field of Nuclear Energy. Criteria for developers who will build and run nuclear power plants were issued soon after this legislation.

A civil nuclear deal with the United States came into effect in 2008, a nuclear cooperation deal with South Korea was established in June 2010, and two more deals were signed with China in 2012. The following year, the International Atomic Energy Agency (IAEA) performed the Integrated Nuclear Infrastructure Review (INIR) in Turkey to evaluate the country's advancement in the planning for a new nuclear power scheme. Although the review was positive, the IAEA advised Turkey to complete the national nuclear energy strategy and to improve the regulating agency.

Regulation and policy

In 2007 a bill concerning construction and operation of nuclear power plants and the sale of their electricity was passed by parliament. It also addresses waste management and decommissioning, providing for a National Radioactive Waste Account and a Decommissioning Account, which generators will pay into progressively.

The International Atomic Energy Agency (IAEA) has recommended "enacting a law on nuclear energy which establishes an independent regulatory body and putting a national policy in place that covers a wide range of issues, as well as further developing the required human resources".

It took over most of the duties of Turkish Atomic Energy Authority (TAEK) like issueing licenses and permits to companies operating nuclear energy and ionizing radiation facilities. TAEK is now exclusively liable for the management of radioactive waste.

Research and development 
Since 1979, a TRIGA research reactor has been running at the Istanbul Technical University named the ITU TRIGA Mark-II Training and Research Reactor. It is supervised by the Turkish Atomic Energy Authority (TAEK). It is the second operational and third installed nuclear research reactors in Turkey, the other being the Çekmece Nuclear Research and Training Center.

Power plants

Akkuyu Nuclear Power Plant

Sinop Nuclear Power Plant

İğneada Nuclear Power Plant 
In 2013 Turkish Minister of Energy and Natural Resources, Taner Yıldız announced that the government was working on the plans of the third nuclear plant, which was projected to be built after 2023 under the management of Turkish engineers.

In 2015 it was announced that İğneada had been selected as the third site. Technology would have come from US based firm Westinghouse Electric Company in the form of two AP1000 and two CAP1400.

Public opinion

Anti nuclear movement 
There have been anti-nuclear protests in the past, for example in April 2006, plans to build a nuclear reactor on the Ince peninsula caused a large anti-nuclear demonstration in the Turkish city of Sinop. Greenpeace, who have expressed concerns over earthquakes and the ability of the authorities to protect the public, have opposed these proposals. There are concerns that no site for the waste has yet been selected. In 2022 an opposition MP in Mersin said he was against Akkuyu because it is 51% owned by Russia.

Economics

Waste
Signed contract for the Akkuyu plant foresees the return of nuclear fuel waste to Russia. Other waste and waste from future plants may be stored in Turkey, although it is not yet known where.

See also
 Turkish Atomic Energy Authority
 List of commercial nuclear reactors#Turkey

References

Sources

External links
Nuclear Power in Turkey, World Nuclear Association
A Study on the Security and Safety Aspects of Switching to Nuclear Power in Turkey

 
Politics of Turkey